Charlotte is an album by the Swedish singer Charlotte Nilsson, released in 1999 as her debut album as a solo artist. In Korea, Charlotte was released as a 2 disc special with CD 2 being all the songs from the "Miss Jealousy" album.

Track listing
 "Yester Playground" (Jelse, Andersson) – 3:43
 "Shooting Star" (Jelse, Andersson) – 3:34
 "Damn You" (Jelse, Andersson) – 4:06
 "I Write You a Love Song" (Evenrude) – 3:44
 "Fairys Flying" (Jelse, Thelenius, Andersson) – 3:41
 "All I Want is You" (Evenrude) – 3:37
 "Take Me to Your Heaven" (Lengstrand, Diedricson) – 3:04
 "Can You Hold Me Tonight" (Jelse, Andersson) – 3:02
 "If Lovin' You is Wrong" (Evenrude) – 4:40
 "Flower in My Garden" (Jelse, Thelenius, Andersson) –
 "Heal Me" (Jelse, Andersson) – 4:40
 "Something" (Jelse, Andersson) – 3:34
 "Don't Wanna Let Go" - Japan bonus track
 "Damn You" (Remix) - Japan bonus track

References

1999 debut albums
Charlotte Perrelli albums